Document engineering is the discipline that addresses the effective design, implementation, and use of information expressed in documents of all kinds. In part, it comprises document-centric synthesis of complementary ideas from information and systems analysis, electronic publishing, business process analysis, and business informatics to ensure that the documents and processes make sense to the people and applications that need them. The Association for Computing Machinery holds annual conferences on Document Engineering for many years. An important book in this area was published in 2008 by Robert J. Glushko and Tim McGrath, which attempts to unify these different analysis and modeling perspectives and helps to specify, design, and implement documents and the processes that create and consume them.

In the context of document engineering, document may refer to any kind of document, but most often refers to documents somehow encoded in digital forms, and to ordered pieces of information extracted or derived from documents, typically to be used by computer applications or web services rather than directly by people. The structure of information both within and as extracted from documents, has particular relevance in the areas of XML and SQL schema design. 

For example, principles of document engineering were applied in the development of the OASIS Universal Business Language. A simple application is where a customer purchases something online. A purchase involves three different business collaborations: between the customer and the online catalog to select the right item, between the retail shop and a credit card authorization service for verification and to charge the customer account, and finally between the retail shop and delivery service in order to ensure the item is delivered to the customer. In order to actualize these internet information exchanges, document engineering addresses the analysis, design, representation, and implementation of the information involved in each step.

From 2003 to 2007, the University of California, Berkeley operated a research center for document engineering, which has been subsumed by its program in Information and Service Design.

The conventional discipline that most resembles document engineering is probably business informatics. However, document engineering emphasizes the need for conceptual modeling of documents and processes at an implementable granularity, and so involves linguistics, ontology, database theory, and a wide range of other disciplines.

The ACM Symposium on Document Engineering is a yearly conference of computer scientists interested in document engineering and related domains of text or document processing, and has been held since 2001.

References

External links
Document Engineering, MIT Press.
Document Engineering, O'Reilly Digital Blogs

Information systems